Will Taylor (born January 10, 2003) is an American college football quarterback and wide receiver for the Clemson Tigers. He is also an outfielder on the Clemson baseball team.

Early life and high school
Taylor grew up in Irmo, South Carolina and originally attended Ben Lippen School in Columbia, South Carolina, where he played baseball and football. He batted .432 with 38 hits in his sophomore baseball season. Taylor passed for 1,647 yards while also rushing for 1,549 yards as a junior. Taylor transferred to Dutch Fork High School in his hometown prior to his senior year. He completed 136-of-203 passes for 2,237 yards and 21 touchdowns with four interceptions and gained 448 rushing yards with 11 touchdowns on 60 carries as Dutch Fork won the Class 5A state championship. In his senior baseball season, Taylor batted .450 with seven home runs, 33 RBIs and 34 runs scored and was named the South Carolina Gatorade Player of the Year. Taylor committed to play college baseball at Clemson during his junior year at the Ben Lippen School and pledged to also play football at the school during his senior football season.

Taylor was considered a potential first round selection in the 2021 MLB Draft. He was selected in the 19th round by the Texas Rangers after he stated his desire to play football at Clemson and opted not to sign.

College career
Taylor entered Clemson as a quarterback with the expectation that he would move to the wide receiver position after his freshman season. He was named the Tigers' primary punt returner going into the 2021 season. Taylor received significant playing time for the first time on September 11, 2021, in a 49-3 win against South Carolina State, rushing for 20 yards and returning three punts for 53 yards. Taylor suffered a season-ending knee injury in the Tigers' fifth game of the season against Boston College.

Taylor missed the beginning of his freshman baseball season due to his knee injury. He began playing with the team in May. Taylor finished the season with a .260 batting average and 14 runs scored in 13 games played. After the season, he played collegiate summer baseball with the Greeneville Flyboys of the Appalachian League.

References

External links

Clemson Tigers baseball bio
Clemson Tigers football bio

Living people
Players of American football from South Carolina
Clemson Tigers football players
People from Irmo, South Carolina
2003 births
Clemson Tigers baseball players
Baseball players from South Carolina